Baton Rouge is an unincorporated community in Chester County, in the U.S. state of South Carolina.

History
The community was named for a red pole (French: baton rouge) which marked the frontier between Indian lands and colonial lands. A variant name is "Batonrouge".

References

Unincorporated communities in South Carolina
Unincorporated communities in Chester County, South Carolina